

	

North Cape is a locality in the Australian state  of South Australia located on the north coast of Kangaroo Island overlooking Investigator Strait about  south-west of the state capital of  Adelaide and about  north of the municipal seat of Kingscote.

Its boundaries were created in March 2002 for the “long established name” which was derived from the most northerly headland on the coastline.

North Cape occupies land bounded by Investigator Strait to the north and by Nepean Bay and its subsidiary, the Bay of Shoals, to the east and the south-east respectively.  Its coastline includes features such as Point Marsden and Cape Rouge.  Land use is divided between conservation and agriculture with the former applying to the coastline in order to “enhance and conserve the natural features of the coast” and latter applying to land in the locality’s southwest.

The coastline from Point Marsden in the east to Cape D'Estaing in the adjoining locality of Emu Bay in the west is listed on the South Australian Heritage Register as a site of “geological and outstanding palaeontological significance.”

North Cape is located within the federal division of Mayo, the state electoral district of Mawson and the local government area of the Kangaroo Island Council.

See also
North Cape (disambiguation)

References
Notes

Citations

Towns on Kangaroo Island